Colonel Allensworth State Historic Park is a state park unit of California, United States, preserving Allensworth, the only California town to be founded, financed and governed by African Americans. The small farming community  was founded in 1908 by Lt. Colonel Allen Allensworth, Professor William Payne, William Peck, a minister; John W. Palmer, a miner; and  Harry A. Mitchell, a real estate agent, dedicated to improving the economic and social status of African Americans.  Colonel Allensworth (1842–1914) had a friendship with Booker T. Washington and was inspired by the  Tuskegee Institute and development in its neighboring town. Allensworth hoped to develop the "Tuskegee of the West".

Uncontrollable circumstances, including a drop in the area's water table, resulted in the town's demise. Allensworth is now an unincorporated area in Tulare County.

Colonel Allensworth State Historic Park is also an Amtrak conditional-flag-stop train station on the San Joaquin trains.

History

Early history

In 1908, United States Army veteran Lt. Colonel Allen Allensworth and Professor William Payne, Rev. William Peck and John W. Palmer, and Harry A. Mitchell sought to build a town where African Americans could own property, learn, and live the American Dream. The site was chosen for fertile soil, adequate water, and its location along a railroad corridor. Black men and women — craftsmen, artisans, businessmen, farmers, ranchers, retired military — moved their families to the newly purchased land. In 1914, the California Eagle newspaper stated that Allensworth deeded land was worth more than $112,000. The affairs of the town were administered by a council form of government known as the Allensworth Progressive Association, which directed the community through its formative and critical early years. Men and women held responsible positions in the community.

Allensworth's economy depended on agriculture; farmers cultivated alfalfa, wheat, sugar beets, and cotton; and raised dairy cattle, chickens, turkeys, and Belgian hares. The town had several businesses and public buildings: bakery, drugstore, livery stable, barbershop, church, school, library, and a machine shop. Sources such as the Oakland Sunshine, a leading black Oakland, California newspaper, in 1913 claimed that Allensworth generated nearly $5,000 monthly in its business ventures.

In 1910 Joshua and Henrietta Singleton opened Singleton's General Store & Post Office. The store sold a variety of merchandise and served as a weigh station for wagons. The Allensworth Hotel was opened by Clara and John Morris; the hotel had eight guestrooms and charged 75 cents per night.

Water problems
In 1908 the southwest corner of Tulare County had abundant water from wells drilled into the then-shallow water table. The artesian wells and water mains laid throughout the residences during and since 1912 were controlled by Allensworth Rural Water Company, a state corporation. But water problems began developing in 1912 and by 1914 had become serious. The declining water tables throughout the area and increasing problems with alkali salts helped to doom the community. As the original settlers moved away, the land values declined, some of the houses were left empty, and others were rented or sold.

By the 1950s Allensworth was an impoverished area without drinkable water supplies; its only water wells were contaminated with arsenic, and state health officials declared them unusable. When the state acquired the land for park purposes, state officials said land owners were paid "market value" but because these values were so low, the state also provided financial assistance to relocate the former owners. According to State Park Ranger Greg Kauffman, "only two or three families were unhappy with the move". And, he said, "the project itself has received strong support".

Colonel Allensworth's death
In 1919 Delilah L. Beasley wrote in her book The Negro Trail-Blazers of California: "The death of Colonel Allensworth was most tragic, because after passing through three wars, he was finally killed by a careless motorcyclist on the streets of Monrovia, California, a few miles out from Los Angeles, the accident occurring on a Sunday morning in September, 1914. The aged Colonel was on his way to preach in a small church of the village and had just stepped from a Pacific Electric street car when these men knocked him down and ran over him, killing him through their careless driving, his death, occurring within twenty-four hours afterwards without his regaining  consciousness, it was like a thunderbolt from a clear sky to the people of the State. He had spent the two years previous in dictating and assisting Professor Charles Alexander to write his autobiography." The book had been sent to the publishers and was ready to come off the press when he was killed.

Widely loved and respected, Allensworth received a military funeral by the Grand Army of the Republic veterans of Los Angeles. Memorial services were held for him throughout the state and nation. He was interred at Rosedale Cemetery in Los Angeles on September 18, 1914. The Allensworth community was devastated. Although Professor William Payne and Oscar Overr assumed the leadership of the colony, no one could replace the Colonel. Without Allensworth's spiritual guidance and leadership, the community began to disintegrate. By 1920, the two leading figures, William Payne and the widow Josephine Allensworth, had left the area. Payne accepted a teaching job in El Centro, while Josephine Allensworth returned to Los Angeles to live with her daughter Nella. The exodus of residents continued during the years of the Great Depression and World War II.

California State Historic Park
In 1968 Cornelius "Ed" Pope, a former resident of Allensworth, worked in Sacramento as a draftsman and planner for the California Department of Parks and Recreation. With the help of a professor at California State University, Sacramento, he wrote a proposal to  restore the Allensworth settlement as a state historical site. In 1972 "Allensworth Historic District" was added to the National Register of Historic Places. Finally, in 1974 then-Governor Ronald Reagan authorized the department to establish the park. Ed Pope returned to the area in his retirement "to become a preservation activist on the scene."

The 100th anniversary of Allensworth was celebrated in October 2008. Events are held throughout the year to commemorate the park's history.

The preserved townsite features nine restored buildings, including a schoolhouse, a hotel, a general store, and library and several homes. The park has a visitor center, and tours are available by making arrangements with the park in advance. The visitor center features a video presentation, "The Spirit of Allensworth."

Fifteen campsites, open all year, accommodate RVs or tents. Each site includes a picnic table and a camp stove; flush toilets are nearby. Facilities for disabled people are available. Turf, trees, and shade ramadas are other features. A nearby picnic area is shaded by 75 large  trees, planted by the California Conservation Corps.

Terrain and environment
The terrain is typical of the southern San Joaquin Valley. Excepting the railroad roadbed, there is less than  elevation difference across town. Like most of the valley, there has been some subsidence probably related to historic overpumping of ground water for irrigation.

A generally warm, dry climate prevails in the Central Valley; it is hot in the summer, mild in the winter. In the Central Valley precipitation falls mainly from October through April. Winter temperatures well below freezing producing frost; however, snow is very rare. Summer temperatures above  are part of the normal pattern.

The valley was historically the site of vernal pools and seasonal lakes before 20th-century diversions of water and agriculture. A  natural gas well field exists west of town. Burrowing owls, a species active in daylight hours, are sometimes present in the  park.

Just north of Allensworth is the  Pixley National Wildlife Refuge, operated by the United States Fish and Wildlife Service. Adjacent to the town is the Allensworth Ecological Reserve. The endangered San Joaquin kit fox (Vulpes macrotis mutica) can be found in this area.

In 2007 the State of California passed Assembly Bill 576, which established a  dairy-free zone around the park.  The bill was in response to two proposed dairies. Environmental activists protested that the operations were likely to have a potentially negative impact (dairy flies and odors) on the adjacent Pixley National Wildlife Refuge, Allensworth Ecological Reserve, and the historic park.

Amtrak station

The Allensworth station or Colonel Allensworth State Historic Park station is located east of the state historic park, just outside the entrance to the park near the Central Valley Highway (SR-43). The station has a platform only with no shelter. The station is served by Amtrak's San Joaquin service between Bakersfield, California and either Oakland or Sacramento, California. It opened some time in or before 2001.

The station is a conditional flag stop, with the train only stopping for groups of 20 or more that make reservations several weeks in advance. Since special arrangements must be made prior to booking trips to and from the station, it does not appear on many of Amtrak's lists of active stations.

Rare 1880s railroad boxcars
Two rare 19th-century railroad boxcars, which are believed to have been the residence of the station agent at Allensworth, have been restored by the California State Railroad Museum and are displayed at Colonel Allensworth State Historic Park. California State Parks contracted with the nonprofit museum in mid-2002 to conserve and restore the two railroad boxcar bodies associated with Allensworth.  Wheels and axles had been removed after the turn of the 20th century; today the boxcars are today considered rare specimens of early railroad  freight cars. For the project, one car was fully documented and received a museum-level  conservation.

One truckless rail car is on display lettered G.C. & S.F. #1332 (Gulf, Colorado & Santa Fe).

References

Further reading
 Allensworth the Freedom Colony
 Beasley, Delilah L. The Negro Trailblazers of  California,. A Compilation of Records from the California Archives in the Bancroft Library at the University of California, in Berkeley; and from the Diaries, Old Papers, and Conversations of Old Pioneers in the State of California (1919). reprinted in 1997 and 2004.  pp. 141, 151–157, 287–288.
 Wheeler, B. Gordon. Black California: The History of African-Americans in the Golden State, Hippocrene Books, New York, 1993 - 
 Wheeler, B. Gordon. "Allensworth: California’s African American  Community". Wild West. February 2000; carried at History.net
 Alexander, Charles. Battles and Victories of Allen Allensworth 1914,  Electronic Edition

External links

 Colonel Allensworth State Historic Park
 The Friends of Allensworth, Official Website
 The Friends of Allensworth, San Diego chapter

African-American history of California
African-American museums in California
California State Historic Parks
Farm museums in California
Former settlements in Tulare County, California
Ghost towns in California
History of the San Joaquin Valley
Museums in Tulare County, California
Open-air museums in California
Parks in the San Joaquin Valley
Parks in Tulare County, California
Protected areas established in 1976
Railway stations in Tulare County, California
Railway stations in the United States opened in 2001
African-American historic house museums